The Casablanca Derby is a derby between the Moroccan football clubs Raja and Wydad. Matches are played in the Stade Mohamed V, often containing a fierce and vibrant crowd.

The Casablanca Derby has extensive national media coverage and is a topic of debate for several days before and after the match between the fans of both clubs, whether in the streets, schools or workplace.

Incidents and memorable matches
As in most of the world's derbies, riots and fights can take place before, during and especially after a major game.

The first match between the two rival was in 1956 in which Raja won 1–0.

The second match was won by Wydad 3–0 in 1957.

In 1978, Raja players withdrew from the match against Wydad during the last 10 minutes of the second-half because they were mistreated after conceding a penalty with a red card to their goalkeeper. Raja players did not accept the referee's decision and left the stadium by order of their captain Mohamed Fakhir, while Pitchou sat on the ball and waited with passion to score this penalty but Raja players refused to continue the match. The game ended by a score of 1–0 for Wydad.

In 1996, Raja defeated Wydad 5–1 in the Moroccan Throne Cup quarts-finals. This score is the highest between the two rivals.

On April 6, 2001, Wydad initially won 3–0, but Raja complained about the illegal participation of the substitute Abdelhaq Ait Laarif who was registered with both Wydad and Étoile de Casablanca. The Moroccan federation accorded the win to Raja.

On September 29, 2001, during the 100th derby which was part of the semifinals for the Moroccan Throne Cup, Youssef Belkhouja, a Wydad player, died on the pitch of a heart attack.

On 24 May 2006, there was a fierce competition between the two rivals to clinch the league title. Raja scored first with a penalty by Abdellatif Jrindou, that result would have given Raja the title; but at the end of the match (at the 90+6 minute), a staggering strike from a long distance by Hicham Louissi gave Wydad the draw needed to win the league for the 16th time after 13 years of the last cup.

On October 20, 2007, during an encounter between rival team supporters, Hamza Eddali, a Wydad fan who was 17, died. He is to date the last person killed in the Casablanca derby.

On April 18, 2010, after Raja beat Wydad with a score of 1–0, a fight broke out between Wydad and Raja fans. Over one hundred people were arrested.

In 2012, Wydad requested the FIFA and Royal Moroccan Football Federation to count the 5 titles that the club won in the regional championship organized during the Colonial Era in Morocco by french authorities before the creation of the Moroccan federation in 1956 as Botola titles. Their request was accepted and so, increased Wydad's Botola titles from 12 to 17. Wydad is the only club in Morocco to have their titles from the colonial era (before 1956) admitted by the FIFA.

On November 23, 2019, the two rivals met in the second round of the Arab Club Championship. This was the first time that the derby took place in a non-local competition. The first game ended 1–1, with Wydad leading by away goals. The second leg was one of if not the most epic match in derby history, with Wydad going up 4–1 with 15 minutes to play and Raja coming back to score in the 94th minute to make it 4–4, with Raja progressing on away goals. This is the record for most combined goals in derby history but the match is also notable for its extraordinary atmosphere, with numerous Tifos being displayed and fireworks and flares going off throughout the match, the latter of which there were so many it looked at times that the stands were on fire.

Results
As of 23 October 2022

Botola

Moroccan Throne Cup

Arab Club Champions Cup

Statistics

Matches Summary

Honours
Wydad leads Raja in terms of official overall trophies. Wydad have 22 domestic league titles compared to 12 for Raja, while both have three titles in the CAF Champions League.

Records

Results

Biggest wins (3+ goals)

Longest undefeated runs

Players

Goalscoring

Personnel at both clubs

Players
The first players to move from Raja to Wydad and back were Abdulaziz Anini and Ezzeddine Abdel-Rafi in 1973.
Raja then Wydad

 1965:  Abdallah Azhar
 1967:  Mustapha Fahim (Melazo)
 1969:  Moussa Hanoun
 1973:  Mohamed Maâroufi
 1973:  Ezzeddine Abdel-Rafi
 1975:  Moustapha Choukri
 1980:  Aziz Kharboush
 1981:  Jawad El Andaloussi
 1981:  Mohamed Fanani
 1983:  Abdellatif Beggar
 1983:  Jawad El Shennawi
 1987:  Fawzi Kadmiri
 1998:  Nabil Okba
 2003:  Adil Serraj
 2004:  Zakaria Aboub 
 2004:  Mourad Fellah 
 2008:  Mustapha Bidoudane 
 2009:  Mohamed Armoumen
 2010:  Mouhssine Iajour
 2011:  Said Fettah 
 2011:  Hicham El Amrani
 2012:  Omar Najdi 
 2012:  Anas El Asbahi
 2017:  Zakaria El Hachimi
 2018:  Michael Babatunde
 2022:  Hamid Ahadad

Wydad then Raja

 1949:  Abdelkader Jalal
  Jamal Bouzambou
 1974:  Mohammed Sahraoui
  Mohamed Beggar
  Mohammed Al-Tibari
 1963:  Mustapha Bettache
 1990:  Mustafa Hers
 1992:  Mustafa Al-Gharashi
 1989:  Mohammed Sahil
 1989:  Mustafa Bark
 1973:  Abdul Aziz Anini
 1992:  Khalil Azmi
 2006:  Khalid Fouhami 
 2009:  Youness Bellakhder 
 2010:  Tarik El Jarmouni 
 2010:  Zakaria Ismaili
 2011:  Abdelhaq Ait Laarif
 2012:  Abdelmajid Eddine
 2012:  Hamza Abourazzouk
 2014:  Jawad Issine
 2014:  Lys Mouithys 
 2015:  Youssef Kaddioui 
 2017:  Abdeladim Khadrouf
 2021:  Mohammed Nahiri
 2022:  Haitam El Bahja

Managers
Raja then Wydad
  Abdelhak El Kadmiri
  Abderrahman Mahjoub
  Abdelkader Lakhmiri
  Dobromir Tashkov
 1997:  Alexandru Moldovan
 2002:  Oscar Fulloné
 2018:   Faouzi Benzarti
 2020:  Juan Carlos Garrido
Wydad then Raja
 1956:  Kacem Kecemi
 1957:  Père Jégo
 1981:  Mustapha Bettache
 2001:  Yuriy Sevastyanenko
 2008:  José Romão

References

External links
 Casablanca clash guarantees drama

Football in Morocco
Sport in Casablanca
Association football rivalries
Raja CA
Wydad AC
1956 establishments in Morocco
Recurring sporting events established in 1956